Jenny and the Mexicats, previously known as Pachucos y la Princesa, is a multicultural band composed of English trumpeter and singer Jenny Ball, Spanish percussionist David González Bernardos, and the Mexican brothers Pantera Mexicat on guitar and Icho Mexicat on double bass. Their style blends elements of flamenco, jazz, folk, and cumbia, with lyrics in both English and Spanish. The band is considered independent, and it does not have a contract with any record company.

Discography

Studio albums
 2012: Jenny and the Mexicats
 2014: Ome
 2017: Mar abierto/Open Sea
2018: Ten Spins Round the Sun (10 Year Anniversary Album)
 2019: Fiesta Ancestral

Singles
 "Verde más allá"
 "Me voy a ir"
 "Flor"
 "Labios"
 "Boulevard"
 "Frenético ritmo"
 "Me and My Man"
 "La diabla"
 "El telón" feat. Vetusta Morla
 "La cumbia del vino"

Collaborations
 "Se viene, se va", Mr. Kilombo (2014)
 "Tiene espinas el rosal", with Grupo Cañaveral (2016)
 "La madre que la trajo", Javier Sólo (2021)

Awards and nominations

References

External links
  

British folk music groups
Indie folk groups
Mexican folk music groups
Musical groups established in 2008
Spanish folk music groups